Aleksandr Yegorov (born June 16, 1976) is a Kyrgyz former swimmer, who specialized in backstroke events. Yegorov competed only in the men's 200 m backstroke at the 2000 Summer Olympics in Sydney. He posted a FINA B-standard entry time of 2:07.11 from the Russian National Championships in Moscow. He challenged five other swimmers in heat one, including Hong Kong's Alex Fong, who later became one of city's most popular singers. He rounded out the field to last place with a slowest time of 2:13.85. Yegorov failed to advance into the semifinals, as he placed forty-fourth overall in the prelims.

References

External links
 

1976 births
Living people
Kyrgyzstani male backstroke swimmers
Olympic swimmers of Kyrgyzstan
Swimmers at the 2000 Summer Olympics
Sportspeople from Bishkek
Kyrgyzstani people of Russian descent
Swimmers at the 1998 Asian Games
Asian Games competitors for Kyrgyzstan
20th-century Kyrgyzstani people
21st-century Kyrgyzstani people